Arthur A. Dela Cruz Jr. (born May 9, 1992) is a Filipino professional basketball player for the NorthPort Batang Pier of the Philippine Basketball Association (PBA).

Early life and high-school career

Dela Cruz started playing basketball when he was in 4th grade at St. Mary’s Academy in Bulacan. It was his father, Arturo dela Cruz Sr., known as Art Dela Cruz, himself a former PBA player, who first introduced him to the sport. In high school, he played as power forward of the San Beda Red Cubs.

College career

Dela Cruz first attended college at the Ateneo de Manila University for one year. He suited up for the Blue Eagles as a rookie in 2010 and played a key role in their campaign, when the Blue Eagles won the title that year. The following year, he returned to his high school alma mater, San Beda College, served one year of residency before finally seeing action for the Red Lions in 2012. Initially, he was a backup to Jake Pascual, but he took the starting "4" slot when Pascual already played out his college eligibility in 2013. In that same year, the Red Lions won their fourth straight title at the expense of Letran, when he was awarded the Finals MVP. In 2015, he led the Red Lions to the Finals once again, only to lose in three games at the expense of the Letran Knights. In his last collegiate game, he finished with a team-high 15 points on 8-of-12 shooting, 13 boards and was two assists shy of a triple-double, on top of two blocks and one steal in 34 minutes in the deciding Game Three.

Professional career
Dela Cruz was picked ninth overall by the Blackwater Elite of the Philippine Basketball Association in the 2015 PBA draft. On October 30, 2015, he signed the two-year rookie deal with Blackwater.

On August 31, 2017, dela Cruz, along with Raymond Aguilar, was traded to the Barangay Ginebra San Miguel for Chris Ellis and Dave Marcelo.

On November 9, 2021, he was traded to the NorthPort Batang Pier for Sidney Onwubere.

PBA career statistics

As of the end of 2022–23 season

Season-by-season averages
 
|-
| align=left | 
| align=left | Blackwater
| 32 || 26.2 || .506 || .220 || .662 || 4.7 || 2.2 || 1.7 || .2 || 11.8
|-
| align=left | 
| align=left | Blackwater
| 12 || 31.1 || .497 || .000 || .682 || 7.2 || 2.8 || 1.3 || .1 || 14.3
|-
| align=left | 
| align=left | Barangay Ginebra
| 2 || 9.9 || .286 || .000 || .500 || 3.0 || 2.0 || 1.0 || .0 || 2.5
|-
| align=left | 
| align=left | Barangay Ginebra
| 32 || 17.4 || .500 || .235 || .719 || 3.0 || 1.4 || .8 || .1 || 6.3
|-
| align=left | 
| align=left | Barangay Ginebra
| 5 || 10.7 || .286 || .000 || .600 || 2.0 || .2 || .2 || .0 || 2.2
|-
| align=left | 
| align=left | NorthPort
| 19 || 9.0 || .479 || .000 || .857 || 1.4 || .6 || .4 || .0 || 3.1
|-class=sortbottom
| align=center colspan=2 | Career
| 102 || 19.7 || .494 || .208 || .691 || 3.7 || 1.6 || 1.0 || .1 || 8.1

Personal life
Dela Cruz is the son of former PBA player and current Terra Firma Dyip assistant coach Arturo dela Cruz. He took  up AB in Communications in San Beda College and his long-term plan is to help his mother with their family business in Bulacan.

References

1992 births
Living people
Barangay Ginebra San Miguel players
Basketball players from Bulacan
Blackwater Bossing players
Filipino men's basketball players
San Beda Red Lions basketball players
People from San Miguel, Bulacan
Power forwards (basketball)
Small forwards
Ateneo Blue Eagles men's basketball players
Blackwater Bossing draft picks
NorthPort Batang Pier players